Pater Noster is a Swedish lighthouse and the name of a small archipelago in Bohuslän on the Swedish west coast.

History
There were plans to build a lighthouse on the island in the 1750s, but a light was instead placed on the fortification of Carlsten in Marstrand. That light was replaced by Pater Noster in 1868. The lighthouse is of engineer Nils Gustaf von Heidenstam's typical iron design.

Pater Noster originally had a large first order Fresnel lens in its lantern and the flame originally ran on colza oil. A paraffin lamp was installed in 1887. The lighthouse was automated in 1964 and the large lens replaced by a small 4th order lens. In 1977 Pater Noster lighthouse was deactivated in favor of the modern lighthouse Hätteberget placed in open water. Pater Noster started to fall out of repair as the salt water made the iron construction rusty and weak.

Restoration
In 2002, a large restoration project began. The lighthouse was transported to the town of Uddevalla, and later to Gothenburg. The tower was very rusty and overall in bad condition; consequently, restoration took much longer than originally planned, mostly because of insufficient funding. But many local companies and persons volunteered to complete the work. In the summer of 2007, the lighthouse was shipped back to Hamneskär. In the autumn it was reactivated.

In 2015, the lens room was renovated and equipped with a high standard kitchen by the furniture design company Marbodal, as a part of their PR-campaign.

In 2020 during the pandemic, a lottery called "The Isolated Cinema" was announced by the Gothenburg Film Festival, with the prize of visiting the lighthouse for looking at movie premieres for one person alone in the lens room the whole festival week. The lottery got worldwide attention, with over 12,000 attenders from more than 45 countries. The winner was an emergency nurse from Sweden.

Also in 2020, the accommodation of the previous lighthouse keepers was renovated and since then, a hotel and conference centre named "Ett Hem vid Horisonten" (transl. 'A Home on the Horizon') is kept in the building. The business has become internationally famous and in 2022, the hotel won the eminent Global New Concept Award by AHEAD Awards that year.

Gallery

See also
 List of lighthouses and lightvessels in Sweden

References

External links

 Sjofartsverket  
 The Swedish Lighthouse Society
 Leuchtturm Pater Noster 
 Pater Noster hotel 
 Pater Nosters Vänner 

Lighthouses completed in 1868
Lighthouses in Sweden
Buildings and structures in Västra Götaland County